Crossdoney is a village and townland in County Cavan, Ireland. The village is on the R154 regional road where it terminates at a junction with the R198. Peculiarly, all buildings in the village sit on one side of the road, and this gives rise to the widely used local expression: "All to one side like Crossdoney".

Crossdoney 1837

Description from Lewis's Topographical Dictionary of Ireland, 1837

Transport

Bus
Whartons Travel operate bus route 975 on behalf of the National Transport Authority. It serves Crossdoney five times daily in each direction (no Sunday service) providing services to Cavan, Arva, Drumlish and Longford, terminating at Longford railway station.

Rail
Crossdoney railway station was a stop on the MGWR line between Cavan town and Inny Junction. The line opened first in July 1856, with a branch opened to Killeshandra in 1886. The entire route closed to passengers in 1947, finally closing for goods in January 1960. The Crossdoney station house is now a private residence.

See also
 List of towns and villages in Ireland

References

Towns and villages in County Cavan
Townlands of County Cavan